A hot dog is a type of sausage, typically served in a hot dog bun. 

Hot dog or hotdog may also refer to:

 The name for a corn dog in New Zealand and South Korea

Film and television
 Hot Dog, a 1928 Disney animated short
 Hot Dog (1930 film), an animated short
 Hot Dog…The Movie, a 1984 skiing comedy film
 Hot Dog (TV series), an NBC television series which aired 1970–1971
 Hot Dog (UK TV series), an ITV children's puppetry television series which aired 1989–1991
 , a 2004 Georgian TV series
 "Hot Dogs" (Veronica Mars), a 2005 episode of the American television series Veronica Mars
 Simon "Hotdogs" Deering, a former Big Brother 2005 Australia housemate and former late night television host

Music
 Hotdog (band), a Filipino band
 MC HotDog (born 1978), Taiwanese rapper

Albums
 Hot Dog (album), by Lou Donaldson, or the title song, 1969
 Hot Dog!, by Buck Owens, or the 1956 title song (see below), 1988
 Take One! (Shakin' Stevens album), 1980; re-released as Hot Dog, 1982

Songs
 "Hot Dog" (Buck Owens song), released by Owens recording as Corky Jones, 1956; covered by Shakin Stevens, 1980
 "Hot Dog", by the Archies from Everything's Archie, 1969
 "Hot Dog", by Elvis Presley from the Loving You film soundtrack, 1957
 "Hot Dog", by Eugenius from Oomalama, 1992
 "Hot Dog", by Led Zeppelin from In Through the Out Door, 1979
 "Hot Dog", by Limp Bizkit from Chocolate Starfish and the Hot Dog Flavored Water, 2000
 "Hot Dog", by LMFAO from Sorry for Party Rocking, 2011
 "Hot Dog", by the New Mastersounds, 2001
 "Hot Dog", by Ranking Stone from Censurado, 2003
 "Hot Dog", by Tea Leaf Green, 2001
 "Hot Dog!", by They Might Be Giants; the closing theme for the TV show Mickey Mouse Clubhouse, 2006
 "Hot Dog (I Love You So)", by the Delfonics from Sound of Sexy Soul, 1969
 "Hot Dog (Watch Me Eat)", by the Detroit Cobras from Baby, 2004

Sports 
 Freestyle skiing, sometimes called "hot-dogging"
 Tweener (tennis), sometimes called a "hot dog"

Other uses
 HotDog, an HTML editor
 Hot Dog (Archie comics), Jughead Jones' pet dog in the comics and TV
 Hotdog (magazine), a UK film magazine
 "Hot DOG", in astronomy, a hot, dust-obscured galaxy

See also
 Wiener (disambiguation)
 Jotdog, a Mexican band